Hillsboro is a city in and the county seat of Montgomery County, Illinois, United States. The population was 6,207 at the 2010 census.

History
The community was founded in 1823 and incorporated on March 26, 1913.

There is some doubt about the origin of the city's name. The local terrain is quite hilly, as a result of the drainage of the Shoal Creek watershed, causing widespread belief that this is the name's source. Alternatively, there is the belief that it was named for Hillsborough, North Carolina, the home of some of the early settlers, including Hiram Rountree and John Nussman.

Geography
Hillsboro is located at  (39.164973, −89.484572).

Climate

Demographics

As of the census of 2000, there were 4,359 people, 1,800 households, and 1,189 families residing in the city. The racial makeup of the city was 97.22% White, 1.10% African American, 0.32% Native American, 0.37% Asian, 0.07% Pacific Islander, 0.39% from other races, and 0.53% from two or more races. Hispanic or Latino of any race were 1.19% of the population.

There were 1,800 households, out of which 33.1% had children under the age of 18 living with them, 50.2% were married couples living together, 11.9% had a female householder with no husband present, and 33.9% were non-families. 30.0% of all households were made up of individuals, and 14.8% had someone living alone who was 65 years of age or older. The average household size was 2.36 and the average family size was 2.91.

In the city, the population was spread out, with 25.8% under the age of 18, 8.4% from 18 to 24, 27.2% from 25 to 44, 21.0% from 45 to 64, and 17.6% who were 65 years of age or older. The median age was 38 years. For every 100 females, there were 85.7 males. For every 100 females age 18 and over, there were 80.3 males.

The median income for a household in the city was $33,075, and the median income for a family was $40,135. Males had a median income of $31,821 versus $18,668 for females. The per capita income for the city was $17,458. About 14.3% of families and 17.2% of the population were below the poverty line, including 24.9% of those under age 18 and 11.9% of those age 65 or over.

Protected areas
The Bremer Wildlife Sanctuary, north of Hillsboro, is the southeastern terminus of the Arches Rail Trail.  The 3-mile-long rail trail connects the Hillsboro area with nearby Butler.

Notable people

 Harry Bellaver (1905–1993), stage, film, and television actor
 Stephen D. Canady (1865–1923), Illinois state legislator and businessman
 John R. Challacombe (1845–1935), Illinois state legislator and businessman
 Otto Funk (1868–1934), violinist
 Brian Graden (born 1963), President of Entertainment, MTV Networks
 Mary Hartline (1926-2020), early television star
 Mark and Matt Hughes (born 1973), mixed martial artists
 Ralph Isselhardt (1910–1972), football player
 Wickliffe Kitchell (1789-1869), Illinois lawyer and politician
 Jesse J. Phillips (1837–1901), Chief Justice of the Illinois Supreme Court
 Norman W. Ray (born 1942), United States admiral
 John H. Rountree (1805–1890), Wisconsin legislator
 John Tillson (1825-1892), Illinois legislator and lawyer
 Stan Wallace (1931-1999), defensive back for Chicago Bears in 1950s
 John Meek Whitehead (1852–1924), Wisconsin state senator

References

External links
 Hillsboro city website
 Hillsboro Schools website
 Hillsboro Illinois Historical Society of Montgomery County Illinois
 City-data.com

Cities in Illinois
Cities in Montgomery County, Illinois
County seats in Illinois
Populated places established in 1823
1823 establishments in Illinois